The International Fertilizer Association (IFA) promotes the efficient and responsible production,distribution and use of plant nutrients to enable sustainable agricultural systems. IFA a membership consists of more than 400 entities from producers through traders and distributors, as well as service providers, research organizations, tech startups and non-governmental organizations.

IFA was founded in 1927 in London as the International Superphosphate Manufacturers Association.

International consultation 
IFA has consultative status with various agencies of the United Nations (UN), including:

Food and Agriculture Organization (FAO)
International Maritime Organization (IMO)
United Nations Conference on Trade and Development (UNCTAD)
United Nations Industrial Development Organization (UNIDO)
United Nations Economic and Social Council (ECOSOC).

The Association also cooperates actively with:

Consultative Group on International Agricultural Research (CGIAR) 
Organisation for Economic Co-operation and Development (OECD) 
United Nations Environment Programme (UNEP) 
World Bank Group 
World Trade Organization (WTO).

References

External links
 

Agricultural organizations based in France
Organizations based in Paris